Bustuchin is a commune in Gorj County, Oltenia, Romania. It is composed of eight villages: Bustuchin, Cionți, Motorgi, Nămete, Poiana-Seciuri, Poienița, Pojaru and Valea Pojarului.

References

Communes in Gorj County
Localities in Oltenia